Matthew Young (born 17 September 1972) is a former Australian rules footballer who played with Hawthorn and St Kilda. After a long stint in the Hawthorn reserves, and limited opportunity in the senior side for his first two seasons, he was selected by St Kilda in the 1996 March draft. Given this new opportunity, Young had a successful 1996 season, ranking high in St Kilda's best and fairest award. He was plagued by a number of injuries during his career, including chronic back problems and a shoulder injury during the 1997 season.

Young played in 17 of 22 matches in the 1997 home and away rounds in which St Kilda qualified in first position for the 1997 AFL Finals Series, winning the club's 2nd Minor Premiership and 1st McClelland Trophy.

This, and the doubts of St Kilda leadership about his ability to play a whole game meant he was dropped from the side for the 1997 Grand Final. 1999 was another successful season, and he was runner up in the best and fairest, however he struggled during 2000 and was cut from the list at the end of the year. Often considered a strong running defender, many disposal errors marred his career.

References

Sources
 Holmesby, Russell & Main, Jim (2007). The Encyclopedia of AFL Footballers. 7th ed. Melbourne: Bas Publishing.

External links
 
 

1972 births
Australian rules footballers from Tasmania
Hawthorn Football Club players
St Kilda Football Club players
Living people
Allies State of Origin players